The 2019 World Junior Figure Skating Championships were held in Zagreb, Croatia from 4 to 10 March 2019.

Records 

The following new ISU best scores were set during this competition:

Qualification

Minimum TES 
The ISU stipulates that the minimum scores must be achieved at an ISU-recognized junior international competition in the ongoing or preceding season, no later than 21 days before the first official practice day.

Number of entries per discipline 
Based on the results of the 2018 Junior World Championships, each ISU member nation can field one to three entries per discipline.

Entries
Member nations began announcing their selections in January 2019. The International Skating Union published the full list of entries on 12 February 2019.

Changes to initial assignments

Results

Men

Ladies

Pairs

Ice dance

Medals summary

Medalists
Medals awarded to the skaters who achieve the highest overall placements in each discipline:

Small medals awarded to the skaters who achieve the highest short program or rhythm dance placements in each discipline:

Medals awarded to the skaters who achieve the highest free skating or free dance placements in each discipline:

Medals by country
Table of medals for overall placement:

Table of small medals for placement in the short segment:

Table of small medals for placement in the free segment:

References

External links 
 2019 World Junior Championships at the International Skating Union

World Junior Figure Skating Championships
International figure skating competitions hosted by Croatia
Sports competitions in Zagreb
World Junior Figure Skating Championships, 2018
World Junior Figure Skating
World Junior Figure Skating
World Junior Figure Skating